The Kokerboom Power Station, is an 18.5 megawatts solar power plant under development in Namibia. The public private partnership (PPP) development project is owned by Alpha Namibia Industries Renewable Power (ANIREP), a Namibian independent power producer (IPP), who was awarded the concession in June 2022, to design, construct, finance, own, operate and maintain the power station. The energy off-taker is "Dundee Precious Metal", a Canadian mining company, for use in its mining operations in the area. This is possible via the national grid "through a modified single-buyer model", under Namibian laws.

Location
The power station would be located in the settlement of Kokerboom, near the city of Keetmanshoop, in Namibia's ǁKaras Region, in southern Namibia.

Overview
The power station has an 18.5 megawatt capacity. Its output will be integrated into the national grid for transmission to the contracted buyer, reportedly the Namibian subsidiary of Dundee Precious Metal, a Canadian mining conglomerate.

According to Construction Review Online, as of June 2022, Namibia's installed capacity was 680 megawatts. At that time, 517 megawatts (76 percent), was sourced from renewable sources. However, 68 percent of the energy utilized in the country is imported the South African utility company, Eskom, under the Southern Africa Power Pool  umbrella. This power station is an attempt to reduce power imports into Namibia.

Construction
As of June 2022, the power purchase agreement had not yet been signed. One that is out of the way, financial closure would need to be achieved. Construction would then begin, after which commercial commissioning would follow.

See also

 List of power stations in Namibia
 Khan Solar Power Station

References

External links
 Approximate Location of Kokerboom Solar Power Station.

Solar power stations in Namibia
Buildings and structures in ǁKaras Region
Energy infrastructure in Africa